The 1931–32 Serie B was the third tournament of this competition played in Italy since its creation.

Teams
Como, Vigevano and Cagliari had been promoted from Prima Divisione, while Livorno and Legnano had been relegated from Serie A.

Final classification

Results

1931-1932
2
Italy